Walter Woodthorpe (17 October 1860 – 6 January 1943) was a South African first-class cricketer. He played for Kimberley in the 1889–90 Currie Cup.

References

External links
 

1860 births
1943 deaths
South African cricketers
Griqualand West cricketers